Chukwuemeka David Obi (born 6 June 2001) is a Nigerian professional footballer who plays as a defender for AFC Fylde.

Career
Aged 15 years and 86 days, he made his professional debut in a Football League Trophy match for Bury on 30 August 2016, coming on as an 85th-minute substitute in a 4–1 win over to Morecambe becoming the youngest player in the club's history.

In October 2016, Obi moved to Liverpool for a six figure fee plus performance based add ons. Despite the move, he did not appear on Liverpool's Under 18 squad lists for the 2016–17 or 2017–18 seasons.

Between September and December 2017 he appeared a number of times for Wigan Athletic's Under 18 squad, scoring in two matches. At the start of the 2018–19 season he was again featuring for Wigan.

In November 2018, he signed his first professional contract with Wigan Atletic.

On 1 February 2021, Obi left Wigan Athletic via mutual consent.

On 16 February 2021, Obi joined National League North side AFC Fylde on a non-contract basis.

Career statistics

Notes

References

External links

2001 births
Living people
Sportspeople from Lagos
Nigerian footballers
English footballers
Nigerian emigrants to the United Kingdom
Association football defenders
Bury F.C. players
Liverpool F.C. players
Wigan Athletic F.C. players
AFC Fylde players
English Football League players